Evan Harding (born September 12, 1984) is an American professional soccer player who currently plays for Screaming Eagles in the CVSA First Division.

Career

Youth and College
Harding attended East Mecklenburg High School, where he was named NCSCA All-State as a senior, and played college soccer at the University of North Carolina at Charlotte. Harding started 73 of 75 games played over four seasons at UNC Charlotte, scoring 11 goals and registering seven assists during his collegiate career. He earned NCCSIA All-State honors, NSCAA All-Mid-Atlantic region honors and All-Atlantic 10 honors in his senior year.

During his college years Harding also played in the USL Premier Development League for the Southern California Seahorses.

Professional
Harding turned professional in 2007 when he signed with the Richmond Kickers of the USL Second Division. He made his professional debut on April 21, 2007 as a substitute in Richmond's 2-0 opening day victory over the Cincinnati Kings. He was part of the Richmond team which won the USL Pro Second Division championship in 2009.

Harding signed a new contract with Richmond on March 23, 2011.

Honors

Richmond Kickers
USL Pro Champions (1): 2009

References

External links
Richmond Kickers bio
UNC Charlotte bio

1984 births
Living people
Canadian soccer players
American soccer players
Charlotte 49ers men's soccer players
Southern California Seahorses players
Richmond Kickers players
Charlotte Eagles players
Canadian emigrants to the United States
Sportspeople from British Columbia
USL League Two players
USL Second Division players
USL Championship players
Soccer players from North Carolina
Association football midfielders